The 2022 Canadian U18 Curling Championships were held from May 1 to 7 at the Oakville Curling Club in Oakville, Ontario. The event was originally scheduled to be held February 14 to 20 in Timmins, Ontario, however, was postponed due to the COVID-19 pandemic in Ontario.

This was the fourth edition of the Canadian U18 Curling Championships. The inaugural edition was held in Moncton, New Brunswick in 2017 and was again held in New Brunswick in Saint Andrews in 2018. After the 2019 event in Sherwood Park, Alberta, the U18 nationals were cancelled in 2020 and 2021 due to the COVID-19 pandemic. The 2022 event will feature twenty-one teams on both the boys and girls sides, each split into three pools of seven. The top three teams from each pool at the end of the round robin advanced to the playoff round Based on results from the 2018 and 2019 events, certain provinces earned two berths to the championship. On the boys side, all regions except for Quebec, Prince Edward Island and the Northwest Territories earned a second spot and in the girls event, all but Prince Edward Island, Newfoundland and Labrador and the Northwest Territories got a second team.

Medallists

Men

Teams
The teams are listed as follows:

Round-robin standings
Final round-robin standings

Round-robin results

All draw times are listed in Eastern Time (UTC−04:00).

Draw 1
Sunday, May 1, 8:00 pm

Draw 2
Monday, May 2, 8:30 am

Draw 3
Monday, May 2, 12:30 pm

Draw 4
Monday, May 2, 4:30 pm

Draw 5
Monday, May 2, 8:30 pm

Draw 6
Tuesday, May 3, 8:00 am

Draw 7
Tuesday, May 3, 11:00 am

Draw 8
Tuesday, May 3, 2:30 pm

Draw 9
Tuesday, May 3, 5:45 pm

Draw 10
Tuesday, May 3, 9:00 pm

Draw 11
Wednesday, May 4, 8:30 am

Draw 12
Wednesday, May 4, 12:30 pm

Draw 13
Wednesday, May 4, 4:30 pm

Draw 14
Wednesday, May 4, 8:30 pm

Draw 15
Thursday, May 5, 8:30 am

Draw 16
Thursday, May 5, 12:30 pm

Draw 17
Thursday, May 5, 4:30 pm

Draw 18
Thursday, May 5, 8:30 pm

Playoffs

Qualification game
Friday, May 6, 8:00 am

Quarterfinals
Friday, May 6, 8:00 am

Friday, May 6, 12:00 pm

Semifinals
Friday, May 6, 4:00 pm

Saturday, May 7, 8:30 am

Final
Saturday, May 7, 4:30 pm

Consolation

A Bracket

B Bracket

C Bracket

Final standings

Women

Teams
The teams are listed as follows:

Round-robin standings
Final round-robin standings

Round-robin results

All draw times are listed in Eastern Time (UTC−04:00).

Draw 1
Sunday, May 1, 8:00 pm

Draw 2
Monday, May 2, 8:30 am

Draw 3
Monday, May 2, 12:30 pm

Draw 4
Monday, May 2, 4:30 pm

Draw 5
Monday, May 2, 8:30 pm

Draw 6
Tuesday, May 3, 8:00 am

Draw 7
Tuesday, May 3, 11:00 am

Draw 8
Tuesday, May 3, 2:30 pm

Draw 9
Tuesday, May 3, 5:45 pm

Draw 10
Tuesday, May 3, 9:00 pm

Draw 11
Wednesday, May 4, 8:30 am

Draw 12
Wednesday, May 4, 12:30 pm

Draw 13
Wednesday, May 4, 4:30 pm

Draw 14
Wednesday, May 4, 8:30 pm

Draw 15
Thursday, May 5, 8:30 am

Draw 16
Thursday, May 5, 12:30 pm

Draw 17
Thursday, May 5, 4:30 pm

Draw 18
Thursday, May 5, 8:30 pm

Playoffs

Qualification game
Friday, May 6, 8:00 am

Quarterfinals
Friday, May 6, 8:00 am

Friday, May 6, 12:00 pm

Semifinals
Friday, May 6, 8:00 pm

Saturday, May 7, 8:30 am

Final
Saturday, May 7, 12:30 pm

Consolation

A Bracket

B Bracket

C Bracket

Final standings

References

External links
Official Website

2022 in Canadian curling
Curling in Ontario
2022 in Ontario
Oakville, Ontario
May 2022 sports events in Canada
Sports events postponed due to the COVID-19 pandemic